Mikuláš Komanický (born 31 July 1951) is a former football player and manager from Slovakia.

References

External links
 

1951 births
Living people
People from Bardejov
Sportspeople from the Prešov Region
Slovak footballers
Partizán Bardejov players
1. FC Tatran Prešov players
Slovak football managers
Slovak Super Liga managers
MFK Ružomberok managers
FC Nitra managers
1. FC Tatran Prešov managers
FK Slavoj Trebišov managers
Partizán Bardejov managers
Slovakia national under-21 football team managers
ENTHOI Lakatamia FC managers
MŠK Rimavská Sobota managers
ŠK Odeva Lipany managers
Expatriate football managers in Cyprus
Slovak expatriate sportspeople in Cyprus
Association footballers not categorized by position
Czechoslovakia international footballers